Plymouth is a village in Huron and Richland counties in the U.S. state of Ohio. The population was 1,857 at the 2010 census.

The Richland County portion of Plymouth is part of the Mansfield Metropolitan Statistical Area, while the Huron County portion is part of the Norwalk Micropolitan Statistical Area.

History
Plymouth was laid out in 1825. The village was named after Plymouth Rock. Plymouth was incorporated in 1834.

Plymouth was formerly the headquarters of the Plymouth Locomotive Works, a builder of industrial railroad locomotives. The factory closed in 1999. The company designed and built an automobile named Plymouth in the early part of the century, but it was not mass-produced, but there were trucks and tractors produced by Commercial Motor Truck Company under the Plymouth name in the same period. Later, Chrysler Motors developed the Plymouth Automobile Division, but thought the Ohio company had infringed on their name. A court battle ensued over the ownership of the name Plymouth, which Chrysler lost when it was determined the original Plymouth car preceded Chrysler's by several years.

The Fate-Root-Heath Company
During the Great Depression, the Fate-Root-Heath Company, later called the Plymouth Locomotive Works designed and built the famous Silver King (originally the Plymouth) tractor, a  favorite of local farmers and known for its fast road gear. The tractors were produced until the 1954 when it was sold to Mountain State Engineering in West Virginia and then discontinued, and parts returned to Plymouth, OH. After the discontinuation of the Silver King Tractor, the many records, design plans, and many other important information was destroyed near by. Not much remains of primary sources documents, the few that were saved were done by factory employees who knew what this information could be used and needed in the future. From surviving records tractors where shipped to OH, IN, KY, PA, NY, NJ, NH and many other New England & Midwest states. About 200 Plymouth tractors, around 8,500 Silver King tractors were built in several models, styles, and sizes, and 75 Silver Kings were produced by the Mountain State Engineering Company.

In 2019 the Plymouth Tractor will be celebrating it 85th Anniversary.

The Silver Kings of Yesteryear Club (SKY) hosts the annual Silver King Festival during the first full weekend of August when restored Silver Kings & Plymouth tractors from around the world are displayed, this is held in conjunction with the local Volunteer Fireman's Department Chicken BBQ Festival. The 2019 dates are August 1 thru the 3rd.

The Silver King tractor can also be seen at the National Tractor Pullers Association National Championship Tractor Pull each year in Bowling Green, OH. Where they serve as tow tractor to the start line. As stated by members, they were asked to become tow tractors because the association needed a "silver tractor" for the pull's Silver Anniversary.

Geography
Plymouth is located at  (40.996121, -82.666746).

The east/west main street in downtown Plymouth is known as East Main and West Broadway and in the surrounding unincorporated areas is known as Base Line Road, as it divides Richland and Huron counties, which puts the village in dual political geographies. This presents several difficulties such as taxes, laws and law enforcement. While the village has its own police force, half shares jurisdiction with the Huron County Sheriff's Department and half with the Richland County Sheriff's Department.

Demographics

2010 census
As of the census of 2010, there were 1,857 people, 696 households, and 499 families living in the village. The racial makeup of the village was 97.6% White, 0.3% African American, 0.2% Native American, 0.2% Asian, 0.9% from other races, and 0.7% from two or more races. Hispanic or Latino of any race were 2.5% of the population.

There were 696 households, of which 40.4% had children under the age of 18 living with them, 47.6% were married couples living together, 18.1% had a female householder with no husband present, 6.0% had a male householder with no wife present, and 28.3% were non-families. 23.7% of all households were made up of individuals, and 11% had someone living alone who was 65 years of age or older. The average household size was 2.67 and the average family size was 3.13.

The median age in the village was 34.1 years. 29.5% of residents were under the age of 18; 9.2% were between the ages of 18 and 24; 26.4% were from 25 to 44; 21.5% were from 45 to 64; and 13.3% were 65 years of age or older. The gender makeup of the village was 48.1% male and 51.9% female.

2000 census
As of the census of 2000, there were 1,852 people, 678 households, and 536 families living in the village. The population density was 834.4 people per square mile (322.1/km). There were 744 housing units at an average density of 335.2 per square mile (129.4/km). The racial makeup of the village was 98.16% White, 0.22% African American, 0.11% Native American, 0.59% from other races, and 0.92% from two or more races. Hispanic or Latino of any race were 1.03% of the population.

There were 678 households, out of which 40.9% had children under the age of 18 living with them, 61.1% were married couples living together, 13.4% had a female householder with no husband present, and 20.8% were non-families. 18.3% of all households were made up of individuals, and 6.9% had someone living alone who was 65 years of age or older. The average household size was 2.73 and the average family size was 3.09.

In the village, the population was spread out, with 31.0% under the age of 18, 8.3% from 18 to 24, 28.5% from 25 to 44, 22.3% from 45 to 64, and 9.9% who were 65 years of age or older. The median age was 33 years. For every 100 females there were 95.2 males. For every 100 females age 18 and over, there were 89.6 males.

The median income for a household in the village was $36,994, and the median income for a family was $40,559. Males had a median income of $35,737 versus $23,807 for females. The per capita income for the village was $15,474. About 10.4% of families and 13.3% of the population were below the poverty line, including 18.8% of those under age 18 and 7.6% of those age 65 or over.

Education
Plymouth is located within the Plymouth-Shiloh Local School District. The district administers three public schools in Plymouth including Plymouth-Shiloh Elementary School, Shiloh Middle School, and Plymouth High School.

Plymouth has a public library, a branch of the Mansfield–Richland County Public Library.

Entertainment
The first movie theater in Plymouth was opened in the mid-1910s by Reuben Deisler. The Deisler Theatre gained some national press because its eponymous operator was completely blind. The building was still standing as of September, 2009.

Notable people

 David Ross Locke, journalist and early political commentator during the American Civil War
 Eleanor Searle Whitney McCollum, spouse of Cornelius Vanderbilt Whitney and founder of the Heritage Center Museum and the Searle House Bed and Breakfast
 John M. C. Smith, U.S. Representative from Michigan

References

External links
 Village website

Villages in Huron County, Ohio
Villages in Richland County, Ohio
Villages in Ohio